In United States agricultural law, Commodity Assistance Program is term used by appropriators to refer to a variety of domestic programs receiving food in the form of USDA supplied commodities.  The term was formalized for the first time in FY1996 appropriations law (P.L. 104-37, October 21, 1995) to refer to the consolidation for funding purposes of three commodity donation programs that are authorized under two separate statutes: the Emergency Food Assistance Program (EFAP), Soup Kitchen-Food Bank Program, and the Commodity Supplemental Food Program (CSFP).

See also 
Cash in lieu of commodities

References 

United States Department of Agriculture programs